Potselui (Russian: Поцелуи, Kisses) is the second compilation album by Nu Virgos.

Track listing

Release history

External links
 Official Website

Nu Virgos albums
2007 compilation albums